Larry Patrick Levis (September 30, 1946 – May 8, 1996) was an American poet who published five award-winning books of poetry during his lifetime. Since his death, three more volumes of poetry, along with a book of essays, have been published to general acclaim.

Life and work

Youth
Larry Levis was born in Fresno, California in 1945. He was the fourth (and youngest) child born to William Kent Levis, a grape grower, and Carol Mayo Levis. The young Levis grew up driving a tractor, picking grapes, and pruning vines in Selma, California, a small fruit-growing town in the San Joaquin Valley. He later wrote of the farms, the vineyards, and the Mexican migrant workers that he worked alongside. He also remembered hanging out in the local billiards parlor on Selma's East Front Street, across from the Southern Pacific Railroad tracks.

Education
Levis earned a bachelor's degree from Fresno State College in 1968, where he had studied under Philip Levine. For Levine's classes and poetry workshops, Levis completed many of the poems that would appear in his first book of poems, Wrecking Crew (1972). Levine and Levis formed a lifelong friendship that would, for each of them, leave an indelible mark on their writing and on their art. Both of them continued to exchange poems for critique and consultation, either by mail or in person, during the rest of Levis's life. Levine would go on to edit Levis's posthumously published 1997 volume, Elegy.

Next, Levis completed a master's degree from Syracuse University in 1970, where he studied under the guidance of poet Donald Justice. One of Levis's classmates at that time, poet Stephen Dunn, has written about their 1969-70 experience at Syracuse:

Finally, Levis earned his Ph.D. from the University of Iowa in 1974. While at Iowa, he renewed his friendship with David St. John, whom he'd first met at Fresno State when both had taken classes with Levine. St John would later edit two of Levis's posthumous publications: The Selected Levis (2000), and The Darkening Trapeze (2016). In his foreword to Elegy,  Levine acknowledged St John's guidance while editing that volume for publication in 1997.

Academic career
Levis taught English at the University of Missouri from 1974–1980. He was co-editor of Missouri Review, from 1977 to 1980. 

From 1980 to 1992, he was an Associate Professor at the University of Utah. where he also directed the Creative Writing Program. He was a Fulbright Lecturer in Yugoslavia in 1988.

From 1992 until his death from a heart attack in 1996, Levis was the Senior Poet and a Professor of English at Virginia Commonwealth University. During this period of time he also taught at the Warren Wilson College MFA Program for Writers.

Awards and recognition
By the late 1960s, Levis had written many of the poems that would appear in his first book, Wrecking Crew (1972), which won the 1971 U. S. Award of the International Poetry Forum, and included publication in the Pitt Poetry Series by the University of Pittsburgh Press. 

The Academy of American Poets named his second book, The Afterlife (1976) as a Lamont Poetry Selection. His third book of poems, The Dollmaker's Ghost, was selected by Stanley Kunitz as the winner of the Open Competition of the National Poetry Series in 1981. 

Other awards included a YM-YWHA Discovery award, three fellowships in poetry from the National Endowment for the Arts, a Fulbright Fellowship, and a 1982 Guggenheim Fellowship. Levis’s poems are often included in many anthologies such as American Alphabets: 25 Contemporary Poets (2006)

Personal life
Levis was married three times. His second wife was Marcia Southwick, a fellow poet, whom he married on March 15, 1975. David St. John served as best man. Together the couple had a son, Nicholas Southwick Levis (b.1978). They were together until the early 1980s, and their marriage eventually ended in divorce. Southwick later married  Murray Gell-Mann, the Nobel Prize-winning physicist, in 1992. 

Levis was married to his first wife, Barbara Campbell, from 1969 to 1973. His third wife was Mary Jane Hale, who he was married to from 1989 to 1990.

Along with his professional and artistic acclaim, Levis struggled with depression, alcohol and drug use throughout his life. In part, the 2016 documentary film about Levis, A Late Style of Fire, explores the “risks and sacrifices that are necessary to live the life of an artist.” The film shows Levis constantly wrestling with the “dark side” of artistic creation. This included various self-destructive and ”bad boy” impulses.

Death
Levis died of cardiac arrest triggered by a cocaine overdose, in Richmond, Virginia on May 8, 1996, at the age of 49.

Legacy
The Levis Reading Prize is awarded each year by the Department of English and its MFA in Creative Writing program at Virginia Commonwealth University (VCU). The prize is given annually in the name of the late Larry Levis for the best first or second book of poetry published in the previous calendar year. Essays and articles about Levis are featured each year in Blackbird, an online journal of literature and the arts published by VMU.

In 2016, a documentary film on the life and poetry of Levis was released titled A Late Style of Fire: Larry Levis, American Poet. It was produced and directed by filmmaker Michele Poulos, and co-produced with her husband, poet Gregory Donovan. Says Donovan:

Selected bibliography
Poetry
Wrecking Crew (1972)
The Afterlife (1977)
The Dollmaker's Ghost (1981)
Winter Stars (1985)
The Widening Spell of the Leaves (1991)
Elegy (1997)The Selected Levis (2000)The Darkening Trapeze: Last Poems (2016)
ProseThe Gazer Within (2000)
FictionBlack Freckles (1992)

Further reading
Buckley, Christopher. Condition of the Spirit - The Life and Work of Larry Levis. (Eastern Washington University, 2004) 

References

External links
Levis Remembered at Blackbird Magazine (links):

Believing in words: the Larry Levis papers, online exhibit of archival materials, Virginia Commonwealth University Libraries
Devotion in the Age of Larry Levis, The Missouri Review. 2005 March 29.
Friends of Dead Poets Society. Larry Levis’ latest (and possibly last) posthumous collection. The Smart Set''. 2016 January 21.

1946 births
1996 deaths
Writers from Fresno, California
University of Missouri faculty
Iowa Writers' Workshop alumni
Iowa Writers' Workshop faculty
Virginia Commonwealth University faculty
20th-century American poets
People from Selma, California